This is a list of episodes for the ITV television series The Main Chance.

Episodes

First Series

Second Series

Third Series

Fourth Series 

Main Chance, The